Craig Colclough is an American bass-baritone. Initially trained as a cellist, Colclough started playing in music theater in high school, and joined the Johnston Center at the University of Redlands, in Redlands, California, where he earned a liberal arts education. Continuing his musical studies after graduating college in 2004, Colclough was later hired by the Los Angeles Opera.

Career 
With the Los Angeles Opera, Colclough appeared in several roles as a member of the company. He then joined Florida Grand Opera's Young Artist Studio, and became a Filene Young Artist at the Wolf Trap Opera Company in 2012.

In 2013–2014, Colclough played the title role in Don Pasquale with the Arizona Opera, played Falstaff with the San Francisco Opera and the Los Angeles Opera, and appeared in Billy Budd with the Los Angeles Opera.

Colclough's European debut was with the English National Opera as Jack Rance in La fanciulla del West in 2014–2015. he also performed again that year with the Los Angeles Opera, as well as with the Atlanta Opera and the Lyric Opera of Kansas City.

In 2016, Craig Colclough returned to London, where he played Scarpia in Tosca with the English National Opera, and debuted the same role with the Canadian Opera Company. He also played Doristo in L'arbore di Diana with the Minnesota Opera and reprised Falstaff with Opera Saratoga.

Colclough debuted at the Metropolitan Opera in New York City in 2019, playing the title role in Verdi's Macbeth.

In 2021, Colclough also performed the title role of Macbeth in Lyric Opera of Chicago's production, the company's first production following an 18-month hiatus during the COVID-19 pandemic.

References

External links
  Craig Colclough's personal Website
  Craig Colclough's page on the Intermusica website

American operatic bass-baritones
21st-century American male opera singers
University of Redlands alumni
Year of birth missing (living people)
Living people